This page lists all described species of the spider family Zoropsidae accepted by the World Spider Catalog :

A

Akamasia

Akamasia Bosselaers, 2002
 A. cyprogenia (Bosselaers, 1997) (type) — Cyprus

Anachemmis

Anachemmis Chamberlin, 1919
 A. aalbui Platnick & Ubick, 2005 — USA
 A. beattyi Platnick & Ubick, 2005 — USA, Mexico
 A. jungi Platnick & Ubick, 2005 — USA
 A. linsdalei Platnick & Ubick, 2005 — USA
 A. sober Chamberlin, 1919 (type) — USA

Austrotengella

Austrotengella Raven, 2012
 A. hackerae Raven, 2012 — Australia (Queensland)
 A. hebronae Raven, 2012 — Australia (New South Wales)
 A. monteithi Raven, 2012 — Australia (Queensland)
 A. plimeri Raven, 2012 — Australia (New South Wales)
 A. toddae Raven, 2012 (type) — Australia (Queensland, New South Wales)
 A. wrighti Raven, 2012 — Australia (Queensland, New South Wales)

B

Birrana

Birrana Raven & Stumkat, 2005
 B. bulburin Raven & Stumkat, 2005 (type) — Australia (Queensland)

C

Cauquenia

Cauquenia Piacentini, Ramírez & Silva, 2013
 C. maule Piacentini, Ramírez & Silva, 2013 (type) — Chile

Chinja

Chinja Polotow & Griswold, 2018
 C. chinja Polotow & Griswold, 2018 (type) — Tanzania
 C. scharffi Polotow & Griswold, 2018 — Tanzania

Ciniflella

Ciniflella Mello-Leitão, 1921
 C. lutea Mello-Leitão, 1921 (type) — Brazil

† Cymbioropsis

† Cymbioropsis Wunderlich, 2017 - Tengellinae

D

Devendra

Devendra Lehtinen, 1967
 D. amaiti Polotow & Griswold, 2017 — Sri Lanka
 D. pardalis (Simon, 1898) (type) — Sri Lanka
 D. pumilus (Simon, 1898) — Sri Lanka
 D. saama Polotow & Griswold, 2017 — Sri Lanka
 D. seriatus (Simon, 1898) — Sri Lanka

E

† Eomatachia

† Eomatachia Petrunkevitch, 1942 - Tengellinae

† Eoprychia

† Eoprychia Petrunkevitch, 1958
 † E. clara Wunderlich, 2017 — Palaeogene Baltic amber
 † E. succini Petrunkevitch, 1958 — Palaeogene Baltic amber
 † E. succinopsis Wunderlich, 2004 — Palaeogene Baltic amber
 † E. vicina Wunderlich, 2004 — Palaeogene Baltic amber

G

Griswoldia

Griswoldia Dippenaar-Schoeman & Jocqué, 1997
 G. acaenata (Griswold, 1991) — South Africa
 G. disparilis (Lawrence, 1952) — South Africa
 G. leleupi (Griswold, 1991) — South Africa
 G. meikleae (Griswold, 1991) — South Africa
 G. melana (Lawrence, 1938) — South Africa
 G. natalensis (Lawrence, 1938) — South Africa
 G. punctata (Lawrence, 1942) — South Africa
 G. robusta (Simon, 1898) (type) — South Africa
 G. sibyna (Griswold, 1991) — South Africa
 G. transversa (Griswold, 1991) — South Africa
 G. urbensis (Lawrence, 1942) — South Africa
 G. zuluensis (Lawrence, 1938) — South Africa

H

Hoedillus

Hoedillus Simon, 1898
 H. sexpunctatus Simon, 1898 (type) — Guatemala, Nicaragua

Huntia

Huntia Gray & Thompson, 2001
 H. deepensis Gray & Thompson, 2001 (type) — Australia (Western Australia)
 H. murrindal Gray & Thompson, 2001 — Australia (Victoria)

I

Itatiaya

Itatiaya Mello-Leitão, 1915
 I. apipema Polotow & Brescovit, 2006 — Brazil
 I. iuba Polotow & Brescovit, 2006 — Brazil
 I. modesta Mello-Leitão, 1915 (type) — Brazil
 I. pucupucu Polotow & Brescovit, 2006 — Brazil
 I. pykyyra Polotow & Brescovit, 2006 — Brazil
 I. tacamby Polotow & Brescovit, 2006 — Brazil
 I. tubixaba Polotow & Brescovit, 2006 — Brazil
 I. ywyty Polotow & Brescovit, 2006 — Brazil

K

Kilyana

Kilyana Raven & Stumkat, 2005
 K. bicarinatus Raven & Stumkat, 2005 — Australia (Queensland)
 K. campbelli Raven & Stumkat, 2005 — Australia (New South Wales)
 K. corbeni Raven & Stumkat, 2005 — Australia (Queensland)
 K. dougcooki Raven & Stumkat, 2005 — Australia (Queensland)
 K. eungella Raven & Stumkat, 2005 — Australia (Queensland)
 K. hendersoni Raven & Stumkat, 2005 (type) — Australia (Queensland)
 K. ingrami Raven & Stumkat, 2005 — Australia (Queensland)
 K. kroombit Raven & Stumkat, 2005 — Australia (Queensland)
 K. lorne Raven & Stumkat, 2005 — Australia (New South Wales)
 K. obrieni Raven & Stumkat, 2005 — Australia (Queensland)

Krukt

Krukt Raven & Stumkat, 2005
 K. cannoni Raven & Stumkat, 2005 — Australia (Queensland)
 K. ebbenielseni Raven & Stumkat, 2005 — Australia (Queensland)
 K. megma Raven & Stumkat, 2005 — Australia (Queensland)
 K. piligyna Raven & Stumkat, 2005 (type) — Australia (Queensland)
 K. vicoopsae Raven & Stumkat, 2005 — Australia (Queensland)

L

Lauricius

Lauricius Simon, 1888
 L. hemicloeinus Simon, 1888 (type) — Mexico
 L. hooki Gertsch, 1941 — USA

Liocranoides

Liocranoides Keyserling, 1881
 L. archeri Platnick, 1999 — USA
 L. coylei Platnick, 1999 — USA
 L. gertschi Platnick, 1999 — USA
 L. tennesseensis Platnick, 1999 — USA
 L. unicolor Keyserling, 1881 (type) — USA

M

Megateg

Megateg Raven & Stumkat, 2005
 M. bartholomai Raven & Stumkat, 2005 — Australia (Queensland)
 M. covacevichae Raven & Stumkat, 2005 — Australia (Queensland)
 M. elegans Raven & Stumkat, 2005 — Australia (Queensland)
 M. gigasep Raven & Stumkat, 2005 — Australia (Queensland)
 M. lesbiae Raven & Stumkat, 2005 — Australia (Queensland)
 M. paulstumkati Raven & Stumkat, 2005 — Australia (Queensland)
 M. ramboldi Raven & Stumkat, 2005 (type) — Australia (Queensland)
 M. spurgeon Raven & Stumkat, 2005 — Australia (Queensland)

P

Phanotea

Phanotea Simon, 1896
 P. cavata Griswold, 1994 — South Africa
 P. ceratogyna Griswold, 1994 — South Africa
 P. digitata Griswold, 1994 — South Africa
 P. knysna Griswold, 1994 — South Africa
 P. lata Griswold, 1994 — South Africa
 P. latebricola Lawrence, 1952 — South Africa
 P. margarita Griswold, 1994 — South Africa
 P. natalensis Lawrence, 1951 — South Africa
 P. orestria Griswold, 1994 — South Africa
 P. peringueyi Simon, 1896 (type) — South Africa
 P. sathegyna Griswold, 1994 — South Africa
 P. simoni Lawrence, 1951 — South Africa
 P. xhosa Griswold, 1994 — South Africa

Pseudoctenus

Pseudoctenus Caporiacco, 1949
 P. meneghettii Caporiacco, 1949 (type) — Kenya, Burundi
 P. thaleri Jocqué, 2009 — Malawi

† Pseudoeoprychia

† Pseudoeoprychia Wunderlich, 2017 - Tengellinae

S

Socalchemmis

Socalchemmis Platnick & Ubick, 2001
 S. arroyoseco Platnick & Ubick, 2007 — USA
 S. bixleri Platnick & Ubick, 2001 — USA
 S. cajalco Platnick & Ubick, 2001 — USA
 S. catavina Platnick & Ubick, 2001 — Mexico
 S. cruz Platnick & Ubick, 2001 — USA
 S. dolichopus (Chamberlin, 1919) (type) — USA
 S. gertschi Platnick & Ubick, 2001 — USA
 S. icenoglei Platnick & Ubick, 2001 — USA
 S. idyllwild Platnick & Ubick, 2001 — USA
 S. kastoni Platnick & Ubick, 2001 — USA, Mexico
 S. miramar Platnick & Ubick, 2001 — USA
 S. monterey Platnick & Ubick, 2001 — USA
 S. palomar Platnick & Ubick, 2001 — USA
 S. prenticei Platnick & Ubick, 2001 — USA
 S. rothi Platnick & Ubick, 2001 — Mexico
 S. shantzi Platnick & Ubick, 2001 — USA
 S. williamsi Platnick & Ubick, 2001 — Mexico

† Succiniropsis

† Succiniropsis Wunderlich, 2004 - Tengellinae

T

Takeoa

Takeoa Lehtinen, 1967
 T. huangshan Tang, Xu & Zhu, 2004 — China
 T. nishimurai (Yaginuma, 1963) (type) — China, Korea, Japan

Tengella

Tengella Dahl, 1901
 T. albolineata (F. O. Pickard-Cambridge, 1902) — Mexico
 T. kalebi Candia-Ramírez & Valdez-Mondragón, 2014 — Mexico
 T. perfuga Dahl, 1901 (type) — Nicaragua
 T. radiata (Kulczyński, 1909) — Honduras to Panama
 T. thaleri Platnick, 2009 — Mexico

Titiotus

Titiotus Simon, 1897
 T. californicus Simon, 1897 (type) — USA
 T. costa Platnick & Ubick, 2008 — USA
 T. flavescens (Chamberlin & Ivie, 1941) — USA
 T. fresno Platnick & Ubick, 2008 — USA
 T. gertschi Platnick & Ubick, 2008 — USA
 T. hansii (Schenkel, 1950) — USA
 T. heberti Platnick & Ubick, 2008 — USA
 T. humboldt Platnick & Ubick, 2008 — USA
 T. icenoglei Platnick & Ubick, 2008 — USA
 T. madera Platnick & Ubick, 2008 — USA
 T. marin Platnick & Ubick, 2008 — USA
 T. roadsend Platnick & Ubick, 2008 — USA
 T. shantzi Platnick & Ubick, 2008 — USA
 T. shasta Platnick & Ubick, 2008 — USA
 T. tahoe Platnick & Ubick, 2008 — USA
 T. tulare Platnick & Ubick, 2008 — USA

U

Uliodon

Uliodon L. Koch, 1873
 U. albopunctatus L. Koch, 1873 (type) — New Zealand
 U. cervinus L. Koch, 1873 — New Zealand
 U. ferrugineus (L. Koch, 1873) — Australia
 U. frenatus (L. Koch, 1873) — New Zealand

W

Wiltona

Wiltona Koçak & Kemal, 2008
 W. filicicola (Forster & Wilton, 1973) (type) — New Zealand

Z

Zorocrates

Zorocrates Simon, 1888
 Z. aemulus Gertsch, 1935 — USA, Mexico
 Z. alternatus Gertsch & Davis, 1936 — USA, Mexico
 Z. apulco Platnick & Ubick, 2007 — Mexico
 Z. badius Simon, 1895 — Mexico
 Z. blas Platnick & Ubick, 2007 — Mexico
 Z. bosencheve Platnick & Ubick, 2007 — Mexico
 Z. chamela Platnick & Ubick, 2007 — Mexico
 Z. chamula Platnick & Ubick, 2007 — Mexico
 Z. chiapa Platnick & Ubick, 2007 — Mexico
 Z. colima Platnick & Ubick, 2007 — Mexico
 Z. contreras Platnick & Ubick, 2007 — Mexico
 Z. fuscus Simon, 1888 (type) — Mexico
 Z. gnaphosoides (O. Pickard-Cambridge, 1892) — Mexico to El Salvador
 Z. guerrerensis Gertsch & Davis, 1940 — Mexico, possibly Central America
 Z. huatusco Platnick & Ubick, 2007 — Mexico
 Z. karli Gertsch & Riechert, 1976 — USA, Mexico
 Z. mistus O. Pickard-Cambridge, 1896 — Mexico
 Z. mordax (O. Pickard-Cambridge, 1898) — Mexico
 Z. nochix Platnick & Ubick, 2007 — Mexico
 Z. oaxaca Platnick & Ubick, 2007 — Mexico
 Z. ocampo Platnick & Ubick, 2007 — Mexico
 Z. pictus Simon, 1895 — Mexico
 Z. pie Platnick & Ubick, 2007 — Mexico
 Z. potosi Platnick & Ubick, 2007 — Mexico
 Z. soledad Platnick & Ubick, 2007 — Mexico
 Z. sotano Platnick & Ubick, 2007 — Mexico
 Z. tequila Platnick & Ubick, 2007 — Mexico
 Z. terrell Platnick & Ubick, 2007 — USA, Mexico
 Z. unicolor (Banks, 1901) — USA, Mexico
 Z. xilitla Platnick & Ubick, 2007 — Mexico
 Z. yolo Platnick & Ubick, 2007 — Mexico

Zoropsis

Zoropsis Simon, 1878
 Z. albertisi Pavesi, 1880 — Tunisia
 Z. beccarii Caporiacco, 1935 — Turkey
 Z. bilineata Dahl, 1901 — Spain (Majorca), Morocco, Algeria
 Z. b. viberti Simon, 1911 — Algeria
 Z. coreana Paik, 1978 — Korea
 Z. kirghizicus Ovtchinnikov & Zonstein, 2001 — Kyrgyzstan
 Z. longensis L. Y. Wang, B. L. Wang & Zhang, 2020 — China
 Z. lutea (Thorell, 1875) — Croatia, Greece, Bulgaria, Ukraine, Turkey, Syria, Lebanon, Israel, Iran
 Z. markamensis Hu & Li, 1987 — China
 Z. media Simon, 1878 — Western Mediterranean
 Z. oertzeni Dahl, 1901 — Italy, Greece, Balkans, Turkey
 Z. pekingensis Schenkel, 1953 — China
 Z. rufipes (Lucas, 1838) — Canary Is., Madeira
 Z. saba Thaler & van Harten, 2006 — Yemen
 Z. spinimana (Dufour, 1820) (type) — Europe, Turkey, Caucasus, Russia (Europe to Far East), Central Asia, China, Japan. Introduced to USA
 Z. tangi Li, Hu & Zhang, 2015 — China (Inner Mongolia)
 Z. thaleri Levy, 2007 — Turkey, Lebanon, Syria, Israel

References

Zoropsidae